The 2017–18 season is Pyunik's 24th season in the Armenian Premier League.

Season events
Prior to the start of the season, Armen Gyulbudaghyants was appointed as the club's manager on 16 June. Less than two-months later, on 8 August 2017, Aleksei Yeryomenko signed a one-year contract with Pyunik to be their manager, but left the club on 31 October 2017, with Armen Gyulbudaghyants returning to manage the team.

Squad

Transfers

In

Out

Released

Friendlies

Competitions

Overall record

Premier League

Results

Table

Armenian Cup

UEFA Europa League

Qualifying rounds

Statistics

Appearances and goals

|-
|colspan="14"|Players who left Shirak during the season:

|}

Goal scorers

Clean sheets

Disciplinary Record

Notes

References

FC Pyunik seasons
Pyunik
Pyunik